The Kansas City Soul were an American basketball team who played in the American Basketball Association professional league. Based in suburban Kansas  City the team began play in the 2011-12 ABA season. The Soul played their home games at Grandview Christian School in Grandview, Missouri.

History
Established in 2010 as the Missouri Rhythm, the team made it to the ABA Playoffs its first season, losing to the Conway Cyclones 146-114 in the first round.

The Rhythm played host to the ABA All-Star Game on 19 April 2014.

The team announced in May 2016 it was rebranding as the Kansas City Soul.

Season-by-season record

References

External links
 Official team website
 Official team Twitter

Defunct American Basketball Association (2000–present) teams
Basketball teams in Missouri
Sports in the Kansas City metropolitan area
Basketball teams established in 2011
2011 establishments in Missouri